is a Japanese voice actress affiliated with 81 Produce.

Kanda is also known under the names Asamiya Saki, Saitou Aiko, Saeki Ami, Suzuki Mari, Tokiwa Misaki, Mimura Sakiko and Mimura Shoko.

Filmography

Anime
Fortune Arterial (Sendō Erika) (2010)

Unknown date
Ah! My Goddess (Tennis club member) (Ep. 1) (xxxx) 
Demonbane (Al-Azif, Etheldreda) (xxxx) 
Figure 17 (Minoru Kaneko) (xxxx) 
Gakuen Alice (Anna, Kawako Usami) (Eps. 3 and 5) (xxxx) 
Gravitation (Woman) (Ep. 1) (xxxx) 
Gunparade Orchestra (Natsuko Saitou) (xxxx) 
Hanaukyo Maid Tai (Maid 1) (Ep. 5) (xxxx) 
Madlax (Female Student B) (Ep. 2) (xxxx) 
PaRappa the Rapper (Gallery, Mother) (Eps. 17 and 25) (xxxx) 
Shrine of the Morning Mist (Izumi Sakibara) (xxxx) 
Tsubasa: Reservoir Chronicle (Information Desk Attendant) (xxxx) 
Tsuki wa Higashi ni Hi wa Nishi ni: Operation Sanctuary (Honami Fujieda) (xxxx) 
Yami to Bōshi to Hon no Tabibito (Seiren) (xxxx)

Games
Atelier Iris: Eternal Mana (Popo) (2004) 

Unknown date
Atelier Iris 2: The Azoth of Destiny (Poe, Dour) (xxxx) 
Atelier Judie ~The Alchemist of Gramnad~ (Judith Volltone) (xxxx) 
Demonbane (Al Azif, Etheldreda) (xxxx) 
Ever 17 (Additional Voices) (xxxx) 
Final Fantasy Tactics Advance (Shara) (xxxx) 
Heart de Roommate (Asumi Hirota) (xxxx) 
Growlanser V (Vanette) (xxxx) 
Shadow Hearts: From the New World (Hildegard Valentine) (xxxx) 
Super Robot Wars UX (Al Azif) (xxxx) 
Tsuki wa Higashi ni Hi wa Nishi ni: Operation Sanctuary (Honami Fujieda) (xxxx)

Drama CDs
Mix Mix Chocolate (Schoolgirl 2)

External links

Rie Kanda at the Seyuu Database

81 Produce voice actors
Living people
Japanese voice actresses
Year of birth missing (living people)